National Labor Federation in Eretz-Israel (NLF) (Histadrut Ha'ovdim Haleumit) is a national trade union center in Israel.

History
The National Labor Federation was founded in 1934 by the Revisionist movement as an alternative to the Histadrut labour federation. The NLF believes in the separation of employers and trade unions. While not politically affiliated, it is seen as sympathetic to Likud.

References

Further reading

Trade unions in Israel
Revisionist Zionism